Timothy Lewis – best known by the stage name Thighpaulsandra – is a Welsh experimental musician and multi-instrumentalist, known mostly for performing on synthesizers and keyboards. He began his career working with Julian Cope in the late 1980s, becoming a member of Cope's touring band. A collaboration with Cope in 1993 followed, forming the experimental duo Queen Elizabeth. In 1997, former Cope guitarist Mike Mooney invited Thighpaulsandra to fill in for the departing Kate Radley on a Spiritualized tour, and he remained with the band until early 2008. In 1998, Lewis also became a member of the experimental band Coil. He has subsequently released several solo albums under the Thighpaulsandra moniker.

Lewis currently performs and records as part of URUK with Massimo Pupillo (of Italian band Zu) and UUUU, a band also featuring Valentina Magaletti and Wire members Graham Lewis and Matthew Simms. He has also been playing with The Charlatans' Tim Burgess since 2020, as part of Burgess' solo backing band.

Career
Beginning his career in the early 1980s with the hair metal band Temper Temper, he next became the house engineer and studio manager at Loco Studios near Newport. It was here that he first met Julian Cope and, as they bonded over a shared love of krautrock, Thighpaulsandra was invited to contribute synthesizers to Cope's Def American albums Autogeddon, 20 Mothers, Interpreter, and Rite2.

In 1997, he joined the band Spiritualized for a US tour and survived the cuts made to the band shortly thereafter. Thighpaulsandra can be heard on the records Live at the Albert Hall, Let It Come Down, Amazing Grace and Songs in A&E. 
Thighpaulsandra also collaborated with Spiritualized's Jason Pierce on the 2008 soundtrack to the Harmony Korine film Mister Lonely.

In 1998 he began working with Coil with Peter Christopherson and John Balance, and performed on Astral Disaster, Musick to Play in the Dark Vol. 1 and Musick to Play in the Dark Vol. 2. Thighpaulsandra was largely responsible for convincing Christopherson and Balance to perform live for the first time in over a decade, first appearing at the Julian Cope curated Cornucopea festival at the Royal Festival Hall in 2000.
Thighpaulsandra is currently working on upcoming Coil re-releases.

His first three solo releases came out via the Coil label, Eskaton. John Balance provided vocals for Thighpaulsandra's first release Some Head EP, and Peter Christopherson designed the artwork for the I, Thighpaulsandra double album and for the following "Double Vulgar" albums. 
The artwork for the Double Vulgar album caused some controversy with several printers not willing to reproduce the controversial imagery. 
Double Vulgar II was delayed, possibly for the same reason, along with the passing of friend and colleague John Balance in 2004.

Since leaving Spiritualized in 2008 Thighpaulsandra has worked with Elizabeth Fraser on her forthcoming solo album and was part of her group for a series of live shows at the Royal Festival Hall in 2012 as part of the Meltdown Festival. 

In September 2013 he joined Wire on their UK and European tours playing keyboards.

After a hiatus from solo work, Thighpaulsandra released The Golden Communion in 2015.

In 2016 and 2017 respectively he began recording and touring with Massimo Pupillo (of Italian band Zu) as Uruk and Valentina Magaletti and Graham Lewis and Matthew Simns as UUUU.
Uruk have released two albums, I Leave A Silver Trail through Blackness in 2017 and Mysterium Coniunctionis in 2018.
UUUU's first release, entitled UUUU is a full-length album released in 2017 and their second, an EP entitled UUUU-EP, was released in 2018.

From 2020 Thighpaulsandra has been playing with Tim Burgess.

Thighpaulsandra is currently working on a new Laniakea album with Daniel O'Sullivan and Massimo Pupillo.

From August 2021 to November 2021 Thighpaulsandra has been playing live with veteran psychedelic rockers Hawkwind.

Discography
Some Head EP – (2000)
I, Thighpaulsandra – (2001)
The Michel Publicity Window E.P. – (2001)
Double Vulgar – (2003)
Rape Scene – (2004)
Double Vulgar II – (2005)
Chamber Music – (2005)
The Lepore Extrusion – (2006)
The Clisto E.P. – (2007)
The Golden Communion – (2015)
Practical Electronics With Thighpaulsandra – (2019)
Compilation appearances
"Heaven Lies About Us in Our Infancy" on Brain in the Wire (2002)
"Christ's Teeth" on ...It Just Is (2005)
"Star Malloy" on Not Alone (2006)
"Am Smear Challenger" on Brainwaves (2006)
Remixes
"At the Crossroads Motel" on Cadaverous Condition: Destroying the Night Sky (2008)
"Moses (Thighpaulsandra Remix)" on Elizabeth Fraser: Moses (2009)

with Coil
Astral Disaster (1999)
Musick to Play in the Dark Vol. 1 (1999)
Musick to Play in the Dark Vol. 2 (2000)
Coil Presents Time Machines (2000)
Queens of the Circulating Library (2000)
Constant Shallowness Leads to Evil (2000)
Live One (2003)
Live Two (2003)
Live Four (2003)
Megalithomania! (2003)
The Key to Joy is Disobedience (2003)
Black Antlers (2004)
Selvaggina, Go Back into the Woods (2004)
ANS (2004)
The Ape of Naples (2005)

with Spiritualized
The Abbey Road EP (1998)
Royal Albert Hall October 10 1997 (1998)
Stop Your Crying (2001)
Let It Come Down (2001)
Out of Sight (2001)
Do It All Over Again (2002)
Amazing Grace (2003)
She Kissed Me (2003)
Cheapster (2004)
Songs in A&E (2008)

with Julian Cope
Autogeddon (1994)
Paranormal in the West Country
20 Mothers (1995)
Ambulence
I Come From Another Planet, Baby
Interpreter (1996)
Planetary Sit-In
Propheteering
Odin (1999)
An Audience with Julian Cope
Rite Now (2002)
"Love Peace & Fuck (2001)"

with Queen Elizabeth
Queen Elizabeth
QE2: Elizabeth Vagina
Queen Elizabeth Hall - Live

with The Waterboys
A Rock in the Weary Land (2000)

with Cyclobe
The Visitors
Angry Eelectric Finger Part Two: Paraparaparallelogramattica
Wounded Galaxies Tap at the Window

with Uruk
 I Leave A Silver Trail Through Blackness
Mysterium Coniunctionis

with UUUU
UUUU
UUUU-EP

with Daniel O'Sullivan 
Folly (O Genesis)

with Tim Burgess
I Love The New Sky (2020)

References

External links
Official Site

 
Living people
The Waterboys members
British experimental musicians
Welsh keyboardists
1958 births
Coil (band) members
Spiritualized members